XERCN (1470 AM, RCN) is a Spanish talk radio station in Tijuana, Baja California, Mexico. It is owned and operated by Uniradio, an operator of primarily Mexican radio stations with offices in San Diego.

History
XEAU-AM 1470 received its first concession in 1943. It soon after affiliated to the Radio Cadena Nacional network, based at 1110 AM in Mexico City, which then bore the XERCN callsign. Radio Cadena Nacional was owned by Rafael Cutberto Navarro (who also created the Kaliman radio drama), and thus the callsign both represented the network and his own name.

When Broadcasting Baja California bought the station sometime in the 1950s or early 1960s, the station became XEBBC-AM and then, after the Mexico City station was sold and its callsign changed, XERCN-AM.

Before it became operated by Uniradio, XERCN broadcast a wide variety of programming, from children's programming (La isla infantil de Beto Grillo) to public affairs programming (Política y Políticos), but it was best known for its radionovelas, produced through the network's production arm, Producciones RCN. Many of these radionovelas are still being heard throughout the world to this day. Among the most famous were its productions of "Las aventuras de Kaliman" and the Porfirio Cadena saga. It was also one of the few stations in Mexico that transmitted old episodes of the Cuban radio comedy "La tremenda corte."

External links
Uniradio Information

References

1943 establishments in Mexico
News and talk radio stations in Mexico
Radio stations established in 1943
Radio stations in Tijuana
Spanish-language radio stations